Sonida Senior Living Corporation is an operator of senior living communities and assisted living centers in the United States. It is based in Addison, Texas.

The company rebranded from Capital Senior Living to Sonida Senior Living in November 2021, following a $154.8 million investment from Conversant Capital.

The company has a market capitalization of $80 million.

References

Malloy, Jennifer. "Market Spotlight: Assisted living occupancy slides". The Associated Press. Monday May 12, 2008 4:44 pm ET
Capital Senior Living considering sale. Dallas Business Journal. Monday, March 24, 2008
Sector Wrap: Assisted living center operators. Housing slump, weak economy pressuring occupancy rates at assisted living center operators. The Associated Press. Friday May 9, 2008, 3:08 pm ET

External links
Sonida Senior Living Corporation

Companies listed on the New York Stock Exchange
Companies established in 1996
Companies based in Dallas